PICA200 is a graphics processing unit (GPU) designed by Digital Media Professionals Inc.  (DMP), a Japanese GPU design startup company, for use in embedded devices such as vehicle systems, mobile phones, cameras, and game consoles. The PICA200 is an IP Core which can be licensed to other companies to incorporate into their SOCs. It was most notably licensed for use in the Nintendo 3DS.

It was announced at SIGGRAPH 2005, and an operational demo, "Mikage", was presented in collaboration with Futuremark at SIGGRAPH 2006.

Overview

The PICA200 is the successor to the ULTRAY2000, a proof of concept graphics workstation presented at SIGGRAPH 2005, created with the goal of testing DMP's attempts at a low power fixed-function "MAESTRO" GPU architecture. 

The PICA200 implements the "MAESTRO-2G" architecture and supports programmable vertex shaders and geometry shaders, with a fixed-function fragment stage. It is advertised as supporting OpenGL ES 1.1 with certain proprietary extensions.

The PICA200 has up to 4 programmable vertex processors which can work in parallel. One of those processors, the "primitive engine", can be used as either vertex processor or a geometry processor.

Some MAESTRO-2G extensions include, per-pixel lighting (where the lighting is calculated per pixel instead of per vertex), procedural texture generation, bidirectional reflectance distribution function (BRDF), Cook-Torrance specular highlights, polygon subdivision (through geometry shaders), soft shadow projection, and fake subsurface scattering   (similar to two-sided lighting).

Applications
The PICA200 is used as the GPU for the Nintendo 3DS portable handheld game console.

Specification
 Manufacturing process: 65 nm
 Maximum clock frequency 400 MHz
 Pixel performance (theoretical):
400 Megapixel/s @100 MHz
800 Megapixel/s @200 MHz
 Vertex performance (theoretical):
40Mtriangle/s @100 MHz
15.3Mpolygon/s @200 MHz
 Power consumption: 0.5-1.0 mW/MHz
 Frame Buffer max. 4095×4095 pixels
 Supported pixel formats: RGBA4444, RGB565, RGBA5551, RGBA8888
 Vertex program (ARB_vertex_program)
 Render to Texture
 Hardware Transform and Lighting(T&L)
 MipMap
 Bilinear texture filtering
 Alpha blending
 Full-scene anti-aliasing (2×2)
 Phong Shading
 Cel Shading
 Perspective-Correct Texture Mapping
 Dot3 Bump Mapping/Normal Mapping.
 Shadow Mapping
 Shadow Volumes
 Self-Shadowing
 Lightmapping
 Environment Mapping/Reflection Mapping
 Volumetric Fog
 Post-processing effects like motion, bloom, depth of field, HDR rendering, gamma correction
 Polygon offset
 Depth Test, Stencil Test, Alpha Test.
 Clipping, Culling
 8-bit stencil buffer
 24-bit depth buffer
 Single/Double/Triple buffer
 5-Stage TEV Pipeline
 TEV Combiner Buffer(Only the first four TEV stages can write to the combiner buffer)
 Color Combiners, Alpha Combiners, Texture Combiners.
 DMP's MAESTRO-2G technology:
 per-pixel lighting
 fake sub-surface scattering
 procedural texture
 refraction mapping
 subdivision primitive
 shadow
 gaseous object rendering
 bidirectional reflectance distribution function
 Cook-Torrance Model
 polygon subdivision
 soft shadowing

References

External links
 PICA200 3D Graphics IP
 PICA200 block diagram
 SIGGRAPH 2006 - 日本発のGPUテクノロジー「PICA200」が公開 (August 15, 2006)
   ニンテンドー3DSにDMPの3DグラフィックスIPコア「PICA200」が採用された理由 (June 22, 2010)

Graphics hardware
Graphics processing units
Nintendo chips